Saint Dorotheus may refer to:

 Dorotheus of Gaza (505 – 565 or 620), Christian monk and abbot
 Dorotheus of Tyre (c. 255 – 362), traditionally credited with an Acts of the Seventy Apostles